Billy and the Boingers Bootleg is the fifth collection of the comic strip series Bloom County by Berkeley Breathed.  It was published in 1987.

It is preceded by Bloom County Babylon and followed by Tales Too Ticklish to Tell.

Prior to publication, Breathed announced a contest to solicit original song submissions as if written by or for the in-comic heavy metal rock group, "Billy and the Boingers".  The first-place winner's song, "I'm A Boinger", was included in the book on the A-side of a flexi disc.  The second-place winner, "U-Stink-But-I-♥-U", was on the B-side. "U-Stink-But-I-♥-U" was performed by New Jersey hardcore band Mucky Pup who also rerecorded the song for their second album, A Boy In A Man's World. The track remains the band's signature song and is still played live to close out their shows.

The cover artwork contains parodies of the covers of two of the best-selling rock albums of 1986/87: the front cover is a send-up of Bruce Springsteen's box set Live/1975–85; the back cover includes a spoof of U2's The Joshua Tree (the original blurry/"narrow-heads" version of the cover; the spoof deliberately imitates these traits).  In both cases, the band member(s) in the original artwork are substituted with members of Billy and the Boingers.

Synopses of major storylines

 Cutter John, having been captured by the Soviets on an ill-fated ballooning mission, is returned to the US in exchange for the communist Bill the Cat, who was awaiting execution for treason.  (p1, 10 strips)
 Steve Dallas ends up in a full upper-body cast after he and Opus attempt to photograph Sean Penn for the Bloom Beacon.  (p6, 17 strips)
 The Defense Department sends Opus $900 million, mistaking him for "Mr. Spock, chief science officer for 'Star Trek' defense research".  The newly opulent Opus enlists Oliver's help in designing "Net Wars", a strategic defense plan involving $500 billion in small bills stitched into a giant space net.  (p15, 18 strips)
 Opus panics when he learns that his demographic (single 6-year-old college-educated penguins) has only a 3% of getting married.  He places a personal ad and embarks on a date with Lola Granola.  (p22, 12 strips)
 Oliver's father panics when he learns that satellite television channels will be scrambled.  Oliver hijacks an HBO broadcast to protest and subsequently gives himself up to the FBI.  (p27, 6 strips)
 Two weeks after his initial date with Lola Granola, Opus proposes marriage, and she accepts.  The couple later has dinner with an ex-boyfriend of hers, Bart Savagewood, who "tests fighter jets for the Navy, catches sharks for fun, and bench-presses 290".  (p29, 20 strips)
 Opus becomes the Bloom Beacon cartoonist, and struggles with deadlines and writer's block.  (p45, 9 strips)
 Formerly communist Bill the Cat sneaks back into the US "to make some dough".  (p49, 3 strips)
 In Oliver's experimentation with teleportation, he accidentally scrambles his DNA with Bill the Cat. Oliver turns feline as Bill the Cat reads Ebony.  It turns out to be a dream.  (p50, 8 strips)
 Opus, as Bloom Beacon cartoonist, accidentally uses an obscure racial slur.  He is burned in effigy, and subsequent cartoons are torn to pieces by the legal department.  (p54, 5 strips)
 Milo and Opus track down and photograph the last living basselope, Rosebud.  The story attracts widespread attention, particularly from the military, who see the basselope as a potential deployment vehicle for tactical warheads.  (p56, 15 strips)
 Opus meets Lola's parents.  Lola's mother encourages her to find someone else, while Lola's father gets Opus drunk.  (p62, 11 strips)
 Disenchanted with the legal profession, Steve Dallas holds auditions for a heavy-metal group.  The band thus formed is christened "Deathtöngue", with Bill the Cat on "electric tongue", Opus on tuba, and Hodge-Podge on drums.  Lola and her mother express disapproval of Opus's new occupation and leather attire, while Reverend Wildmon enjoys the group's "rousing little songs".  (p69, 28 strips)
 Steve discovers that he has only six months to live, unless he gives up smoking.  With the assistance of Opus, Steve is tied to a chair to wait out his detoxification.  A half-hour later, Steve is chasing Opus with an axe, trapping him in the toilet.  Steve's withdrawal is eventually neutralized with a pantry full of Twinkies, Ding Dongs, pickles, and Purina Dog Chow.  (p88, 14 strips)
 Jealous of Lola's reaction to Sylvester Stallone and Arnold Schwarzenegger, Opus attempts to buff up, resulting in injury to himself and others.  (p94, 5 strips)
 Opus takes a tour of the "landmines" on the path of a modern, maturing relationship.  They consist of The Big Lie, The Honest Opinion, The Big Adjustment, The Big Confession, The Big Casualness, and The Big Spat.  (p96, 6 strips)
 Steve Dallas and Bill the Cat are subpoenaed to testify at the special Senate hearings on "porn rock".  Bowing to pressure from "Tippy Gorp", Steve announces that Deathtöngue has been renamed "Billy and the Boingers".  (p99, 7 strips)
 Armand Dipthong, Chief Editor of the Bloom Picayune, attempts to and eventually succeeds in writing a "truly frank article on the public-health threat of AIDS".  (p101, 5 strips)
 Binkley's anxiety closet presents Binkley himself as he will be in twenty years.  Binkley learns that he will lose his hair, work a menial job, and marry his fifth-grade nemesis.  (p103, 8 strips)
 Unsatisfied with his appearance, Opus attempts to lose weight.  His approaches include fad diets, an elastic belt, liposuction with a household vacuum cleaner and the negative reinforcement of getting whacked on the head when reaching for food.  He finally concludes that he simply must "eat less and exercise".  (p106, 12 strips)
 Binkley convinces the boardinghouse residents to become vegetarians.  (p113, 6 strips)
 With the sponsorship of "Dr. Scholl's Odor-Eaters", Billy and the Boingers sets off for their one-stop world tour, to the Annual Moose Lodge Banquet in Albuquerque.  (p115, 18 strips)

References

Bloom County
Books by Berkeley Breathed
Little, Brown and Company books
1987 books
Flexi discs